Los Guayes Airport ,  is a rural airstrip on the north shore of Colico Lake in the Araucanía Region of Chile. The nearest city is Cunco,  to the north.

South approach and departure are over the lake.

See also

Transport in Chile
List of airports in Chile

References

External links
OpenStreetMap - Los Guayes
OurAirports - Los Guayes
FallingRain - Los Guayes Airport

Airports in La Araucanía Region